Eosipho is a genus of sea snails, marine gastropod mollusks in the family Eosiphonidae, the true whelks and their allies.

Species
Species within the genus Eosipho include:
 † Eosipho cinguliferus (De Cristofori & Jan, 1832) 
 † Eosipho hoernesi (Bellardi, 1873) 
 † Eosipho latesulcatus (Bellardi, 1872) 
 Eosipho smithi (Schepman, 1911)
 Species brought into synonymy
 Eosipho aldermenensis (Powell, 1971): synonym of Calagrassor aldermenensis (Powell, 1971)
 Eosipho auzendei Warén & Bouchet, 2001: synonym of Enigmaticolus auzendei (Warén & Bouchet, 2001)
 Eosipho atlanticus Fraussen & Hadorn, 2005: synonym of Manaria atlantica (Fraussen & Hadorn, 2005) (original combination; inclusion in Manaria tentative)
 Eosipho canetae (Clench & Aguayo, 1944): synonym of Manaria canetae (Clench & Aguayo, 1944)
 Eosipho coriolis Bouchet & Waren, 1986: synonym of Gaillea coriolis (Bouchet & Warén, 1986)
 Eosipho dentatus (Schepman, 1911): synonym of Preangeria dentata (Schepman, 1911)
 Eosipho desbruyeresi Okutani & Ohta, 1993: synonym of Enigmaticolus desbruyeresi (Okutani & Ohta, 1993)
 Eosipho engonia Bouchet & Warén, 1986: synonym of Gaillea engonia (Bouchet & Warén, 1986)
 Eosipho hayashi (Shikama, 1971): synonym of Calagrassor hayashii (Shikama, 1971)
 Eosipho poppei Fraussen, 2001: synonym of Calagrassor poppei (Fraussen, 2001)
 Eosipho tashiensis (Lee & Lan, 2002): synonym of Calagrassor tashiensis (Lee & Lan, 2002)
 Eosipho thorybopus Bouchet & Waren, 1986: synonym of Manaria thorybopus (Bouchet & Warén, 1986)
 Eosipho tosaensis Okutani & Iwahori, 1992: synonym of Gaillea tosaensis (Okutani & Iwahori, 1992)
 Eosipho zephyrus Fraussen, Sellanes & Stahlschmidt, 2012: synonym of Calagrassor zephyrus (Fraussen, Sellanes & Stahlschmidt, 2012)

References

 Bouchet P. & Warén A. (1986 ["1985"]) Mollusca Gastropoda: Taxonomical notes on tropical deep water Buccinidae with descriptions of new taxa. Mémoires du Muséum National d'Histoire Naturelle, A, 133: 457-517.
The extensive Indo-Pacific deep-water radiation of Manaria E. A. Smith, 1906 (Gastropoda: Buccinidae) and related genera, with descriptions of 21 new species, in HEROS V., STRONG E. & BOUCHET P. (eds), Tropical Deep-Sea Benthos 29. Mémoires du Muséum national d'Histoire naturelle 208: 363-456

External links
 Kantor Yu.I., Puillandre N., Fraussen K., Fedosov A.E. & Bouchet P. (2013) Deep-water Buccinidae (Gastropoda: Neogastropoda) from sunken wood, vents and seeps: Molecular phylogeny and taxonomy. Journal of the Marine Biological Association of the United Kingdom, 93(8): 2177-2195

Eosiphonidae